John Green,  (born 14 August 1953) is a Church of England priest and former Royal Navy chaplain. He was Chaplain of the Fleet, Director General of the Naval Chaplaincy Service and Archdeacon for the Royal Navy from 2006 to 2010. He was Archdeacon Pastor in the Diocese of Coventry from 2012 until his retirement in 2017.

He was born on 14 August 1953 and educated at North East London Polytechnic. From 1974 to 1980 he was a Project Engineer with Thorn Lighting Ltd. He was ordained in 1983 after studying at Lincoln Theological College and began his ecclesiastical career with curacies at St Michael and All Angels, Watford and St Stephen's Church, St Albans.

He became a naval chaplain in 1991: his service included
 , 1991–1992
 3rd Destroyer Sqdn, 1992–1993
 HMNB Portsmouth, 1993–1994
 , 1994–1995
 Minor Warfare Vessel Flotilla, 1996–1998
 Staff Chaplain to Chaplain of the Fleet, 1998–2001
 , 2001–2003
 , 2003–2006
 Chaplain of the Fleet and Director General, Naval Chaplaincy Service 2006–2010
He headed the Naval Chaplaincy Service Board of Management with responsibility for policy making and overall leadership. As Archdeacon for the Royal Navy he was the senior Anglican chaplain in the Royal Navy.

Green was appointed Companion of the Order of the Bath (CB) in the 2010 New Year Honours.

In September 2013, Green became Associate Minister at St Mary Magdalen, Chapelfields, in the Diocese of Coventry, a post which he relinquished on his retirement in 2017.

Footnotes

1953 births
Living people
21st-century English Anglican priests
Chaplains of the Fleet
Archdeacons of Coventry
Companions of the Order of the Bath
Honorary Chaplains to the Queen
People associated with the University of East London
Alumni of Lincoln Theological College
Church of England archdeacons (military)